WEC 28: Faber vs. Farrar was the fourth mixed martial arts event held by the World Extreme Cagefighting under Zuffa management. The event was held on June 3, 2007. WEC 28 was the first WEC to be aired live on the Versus Network.  The main event was a Featherweight title defense by WEC Featherweight champion, Urijah Faber.

Results

Reported payouts
The following is the reported payout to the fighters as reported to the Nevada State Athletic Commission. It does not include sponsor money or "locker room" bonuses often given by the WEC. 

Urijah Faber: $20,000 ($10,000 win bonus) def. Chance Farrar:$4,000
Rani Yahya: $10,000 ($5,000 win bonus) def. Mark Hominick: $6,000
Alex Karalexis: $10,000 ($5,000 win bonus) def. John Smith: $1,000
Brian Stann: $8,000 ($4,000 win bonus) def. Craig Zellner: $2,000
Brock Larson: $16,000 ($8,000 win bonus) def. Kevin Knabjian: $2,000
John Alessio: $18,000 ($9,000 win bonus) def. Alex Serdyukov: $6,000 
Cub Swanson: $8,000 ($4,000 win bonus) def. Micah Miller $4,000
Brian Bowles: $4,000 ($2,000 win bonus) def. Charlie Valencia $6,000
Jeff Bedard: $6,000 ($3,000 win bonus) def. Mike French: $3,000

See also 
 World Extreme Cagefighting
 List of WEC champions
 List of WEC events
 2007 in WEC

References

External links
Official WEC website
 Official Sherdog fight card

World Extreme Cagefighting events
2007 in mixed martial arts
Mixed martial arts in Las Vegas
2007 in sports in Nevada
Hard Rock Hotel and Casino (Las Vegas)